Nizzola is an Italian surname. Notable people with the surname include:

Jacopo Nizzola (1515–1589), Italian artist
Marcello Nizzola (1900–1947), Italian Olympic wrestler 
Garibaldo Nizzola (born 1927), Italian Olympic wrestler, son of Marcello Nizzola

Italian-language surnames